Bash! (also released as Modern Mainstream) is an album by jazz drummer Dave Bailey which was originally released on the Jazzline label in 1961. Different releases of the same material have appeared under the names of sidemen on the date. The album features pianist Tommy Flanagan and was re-released as Tommy Flanagan Trio And Sextet on the Onyx label and on the Xanadu label in 1973. It was also re-released under trumpeter Kenny Dorham's name as Osmosis on CD in 1990 on the Black Lion label with 4 alternate takes.

Reception

DownBeat magazine's March 1, 1962 review stated: "Bash! presents a relaxed and enjoyable blowing session..."
Allmusic awarded the album 3 stars.

Track listing 
 "Osmosis" (Osie Johnson) - 10:28
 "Soul Support" (Norris Turney) - 5:10
 "Grand Street" (Sonny Rollins) - 6:00
 "Like Someone in Love" (Johnny Burke, Jimmy van Heusen) - 3:59
 "Oscar for Oscar" (Kenny Dorham) - 6:18
 "B.M.T. Express" (Rudy Stevenson) - 7:33
 "Just Friends" (John Klenner, Sam M. Lewis) - 3:39
 "Soul Support" [take 2] (Turney) - 5:08 Bonus track on CD reissue 
 "Grand Street" [take 1] (Rollins) - 5:59 Bonus track on CD reissue 
 "Like Someone in Love" [take 2] (Burke, van Heusen) - 3:12 Bonus track on CD reissue 
 "Osmosis" [take 1] (Johnson) - 11:46 Bonus track on CD reissue

Personnel 
Dave Bailey - drums
Kenny Dorham - trumpet
Curtis Fuller - trombone
Frank Haynes - tenor saxophone
Tommy Flanagan - piano - trio 4,7 and 10
Ben Tucker - bass

References 

Dave Bailey (musician) albums
Tommy Flanagan albums
Kenny Dorham albums
1961 albums
Xanadu Records albums
Black Lion Records albums